Lalit is a prominent raga in Hindustani classical music. It is commonly described as serene and devotional and is performed at dawn time of the day.

The swara (notes of the Indian musical scale) of Lalit put emphasis on the minor second (Re) and minor sixth (Dha), and include natural and sharp fourth (Ma), but omit the commonly used perfect fifth (Pa). Author Peter Lavezzoli stated the raga was difficult to play for Western classical musicians because of its scale. Jairazbhoy argued the use of both forms of Ma was an apparent chromaticism, but that one of the Ma notes was a diminished Pa. Lalit with a different scale was identified in the 16th century, and a raga Lalita existed before.

Pakad - Chalan of Lalit: Re♭, Ma-Ma#-Ma Ga Ma, Ma#Ni, Sa

As can be seen from above, the raga uses both the flat and the upper Ma and that makes this raga very distinct from other ragas. Deliberate oscillation on the cusp formed between Ma-Ma# and Ni is commonly heard.

In the Gwalior tradition of singing, and among many dhrupadiyas(colloquial term used to refer Dhrupad singers), Lalit is sung with a shuddh dhaivat (natural sixth), and has a slightly different chalan (way of moving).

Film songs

Language:Tamil

Language:Hindi

Hindustani Classical Music Composition(Bandish) set in Raga Lalit

References

External links
 More details about the Lalit raga

Hindustani ragas